John Pearson Duncan (22 February 1949 – 8 October 2022) was a Scottish football player and manager. He guided Chesterfield to the FA Cup semi-finals in 1997.

Playing career
Born in Dundee, Duncan played as a forward for Dundee, Tottenham Hotspur, Derby County, Scunthorpe United, and also represented the Scottish League XI.

Managerial career
Duncan managed Scunthorpe United, Hartlepool United, Chesterfield and Ipswich Town.

Duncan's first managerial role was at Scunthorpe United. After a brief spell at Hartlepool United, Duncan was appointed Chesterfield manager in the summer of 1983 and led them to the Fourth Division title in 1985. After keeping the club in the Third Division the following season, he was appointed Ipswich Town manager in the summer of 1986 following their relegation to the Second Division.

Duncan led Ipswich to top-half finishes in the Second Division but was sacked in 1990 after failing to lead promotion challenges. After leaving Ipswich, Duncan became a teacher at a Suffolk school before returning to Chesterfield in February 1993. In his second spell at the club, Chesterfield won the Division Three playoffs in 1995 and reached the FA Cup semi-finals in 1996-97, losing to Middlesbrough in a replay.

Duncan was sacked by Chesterfield in April 2000 after their relegation back to Division Three. He was awarded a testimonial by Chesterfield in 2002.

Duncan spent four seasons managing Loughborough University from 2007, winning the Midland Combination League Cup in 2008 and the League title and promotion to the Midland Football Alliance in 2009.

Duncan joined the League Managers Association in 2009, eventually becoming technical manager.

References

External links 

1949 births
2022 deaths
Chesterfield F.C. managers
Derby County F.C. players
Dundee F.C. players
Association football forwards
Hartlepool United F.C. managers
Ipswich Town F.C. managers
People associated with Loughborough University
Footballers from Dundee
Scottish Football League players
Scottish football managers
Scottish footballers
Scunthorpe United F.C. managers
Scunthorpe United F.C. players
English Football League players
Tottenham Hotspur F.C. players
Scottish Football League representative players
English Football League managers
Broughty Athletic F.C. players